Antariksham 9000 KMPH is a 2018 Indian Telugu-language science fiction adventure film written and directed by Sankalp Reddy. The film stars Varun Tej, Aditi Rao Hydari, Lavanya Tripathi, and Rahman while Srinivas Avasarala, Satya Dev, and Raja Chembolu play supporting roles. The film is released on 21 December 2018.

Plot
The film begins with a satellite moving into the darker side of the Moon. One of the Indian satellites, Mihira, has lost connection with the Space Station and is losing speed. This would lead to a collision with  Chinese satellite and would lead to chain reaction resulting in a communication blackout across the world. The system codes to make repairs is known only to Dev - a passionate scientist at the station, who had quit the Space program five years ago. He was in love with the Station Director Chandrakanth's daughter, Paaru, a school teacher. He passionately works on Viprayaan, a satellite that will give data about water in the Moon. There is a glitch in the satellite after its takeoff and Dev drives to the space station to fix it, along with his fiancee. He loses control of the car in his rush and meets with an accident, losing both the satellite and his fiancée.  This breaks him and he quits his job. He is now needed to fix Mihira and he comes back after five years from his life as a school teacher as part of the mission and manages to fix the critical glitch with the help of Riya, his colleague.

Cast
 Varun Tej as Dev
 Aditi Rao Hydari as Riya
 Lavanya Tripathi as Parvathi "Paaru"
 Rahman as Director of ISC, Chandrakanth, Parvathi's father
 Satya Dev as Karan and Aditya (Dual role)
 Srinivas Avasarala as Mohan
 Raja Chembolu as Sanjay
 Kunal Kaushik as Kunal
 Tharakesh as Dev's brother
 Pavani Gangireddy

Production
Principal photography of the film began on 19 April 2018. The shooting of the film was completed on 1 October 2018. Many scenes of the film were shot in zero-gravity sets in Hyderabad. Some crucial scenes were shot in Mahindra École Centrale, which will stand in for Indian Space Research Organisation in the film.

Soundtrack 

The music was composed by Prashanth R Vihari and released on Aditya Music.

Critical reception
Neeshita Nyayapati of The Times of India stated that Antariksham is unnecessarily melodramatic and gave the film 2.5 stars. Sangeetha Devi of The Hindu praised the production values of the film.

Release 
The film released on 21 December 2018.

References

External links
 

2018 films
2010s Telugu-language films
Films about astronauts
Space adventure films
2010s science fiction adventure films
Indian science fiction adventure films
Films shot in Bulgaria
Films shot in Hyderabad, India
Indian Space Research Organisation in fiction
Films directed by Sankalp Reddy
Indian science fiction films